The Parasport.de Fun is a family of German paramotors that was designed and produced by Parasport.de of Schwanewede for powered paragliding. Now out of production, when it was available the aircraft was supplied complete and ready-to-fly.

Design and development
The Fun was designed to comply with the US FAR 103 Ultralight Vehicles rules as well as European regulations. It features a paraglider-style wing, single-place accommodation and a single engine in pusher configuration with a  reduction drive and a  diameter two-bladed wooden propeller, depending on the model. The aircraft is built predominantly from aluminium  and composites for lightness and can be quickly disassembled for ground transport. A reserve parachute is integrated into the composite seat on the harness.

As is the case with all paramotors, take-off and landing is accomplished by foot. Inflight steering is accomplished via handles that actuate the canopy brakes, creating roll and yaw.

Variants
Fun
Base model with a  Vittorazi 130 engine in pusher configuration with a 2.31:1 ratio reduction drive and a  diameter two-bladed wooden propeller.
Fun Alu
Model with a  engine in pusher configuration with a 2.30:1 ratio reduction drive and a  diameter two-bladed wooden propeller.
Fun Power
Model with a  JPX 130 engine in pusher configuration with a 2.5:1 ratio reduction drive and a  diameter two-bladed wooden propeller.
Fun Solo
Model with a  Solo 210 engine in pusher configuration with a 2.5:1 ratio reduction drive and a  diameter two-bladed wooden propeller.

Specifications (Fun Solo)

References

Fun
2000s German ultralight aircraft
Single-engined pusher aircraft
Paramotors